Statistics of the Chinese Taipei National Football League for the 2002–03 season.

Overview
Taipower won the championship.

References
RSSSF

Chinese Taipei National Football League seasons
Chinese Taipei
1
1